The 1993 New Jersey gubernatorial election was held on November 2, 1993. Incumbent Democratic governor James Florio was narrowly defeated by Republican former Freeholder and 1990 U.S. Senate nominee Christine Todd Whitman following backlash from voters regarding tax increases that had occurred during Florio's tenure. Whitman became the first, and as of 2022, only female governor of New Jersey.

Primary elections were held on June 8. In the Democratic primary, Governor Florio's only challenger, anti-tax activist John Budzash, was disqualified from the ballot after his signatures were alleged to be invalid. In the Republican primary, Whitman defeated W. Cary Edwards and James Wallwork in a three-way race. This was the first gubernatorial election in the state's history where an incumbent governor lost re-election. 

This is also the most recent occasion that Cape May County voted Democratic in a gubernatorial election.

Background

1989 election 

In 1989, Jim Florio defeated Jim Courter in a landslide. It was Florio's third campaign for Governor; he lost the Democratic nomination to incumbent Governor Brendan Byrne in 1977 and lost the general election to Thomas Kean in 1981.

During the 1989 campaign, Florio said that a tax increase was highly unlikely.

Florio administration 
The centerpiece of the Florio administration's legislative agenda was a $2.8 billion increase in tax revenues, which one consultant identified "the largest single tax increase in the history of the finances of the 50 states" and "a national test case on both political and economic grounds." The tax increase was highly unpopular, leading to non-partisan protests throughout the state. The Florio administration adopted a wait-and-see approach, hoping that protests would desist once the legislative package delivered benefits in the form of rebate checks, lower auto insurance rates, and increased funding for education. A similar dynamic had been seen in 1977, when Governor Byrne recovered from the passage of an unpopular state income tax to win re-election.

Two other major legislative achievements were a popular gun control measure targeted at "assault-style weapons" and the Quality Education Act, which set new standards for public schools and set strict spending caps on local school boards.

1990 United States Senate election 

By fall 1990, Florio's approval rating sank to 18 percent; it would not exceed the low twenties until 1992.

The political impact of the anti-Florio "tax revolt" manifested in November 1990, when incumbent United States Senator Bill Bradley was nearly unseated by Christine Todd Whitman. During her campaign, Whitman repeatedly asked Bradley for his position on the increase, but he demurred, calling it a state issue. Whitman's underdog near-victory endeared her to the Republican voter base and made her a symbol of opposition to Florio.

1991 midterm elections 

Republicans centered their 1991 legislative campaign on opposition to the Florio tax increase, as did even some incumbent Democrats, such as Senator Paul Contillo. Florio also faced backlash from the National Rifle Association, which spent nearly $250,000 targeting candidates in both parties who had voted in favor of the bill and supporting those who pledged to repeal it, and the New Jersey Education Association, which had supported Florio in 1989 but endorsed almost exclusively Republican candidates in response to the education spending caps.

The result was a resounding Republican victory; the party gained ten seats in the Senate (controlling the chamber for the first time since 1978) and 21 seats in the General Assembly. Both houses had a veto-proof Republican majority, which may have drawn political pressure off Florio for the remainder of his term. His approval ratings began to rebound as the Republican legislature was given a share of blame for the state's budgetary dysfunction.

Democratic primary

Candidates
 Jim Florio, incumbent Governor

Disqualified 
 John Budzash, anti-tax protestor

Florio was unopposed in the June primary election. Former Howell Township postal worker, John Budzash, originally filed to run against Florio in the primary. Budzash, who switched his party registration from Republican to Democratic one day before the filing deadline, led Hands Across New Jersey, a citizens group that protested the state tax increases. He was removed following a complaint from then-state party chair Raymond Lesniak alleging that many of his petition signatures were invalid.

Results

Republican primary

Background
Following W. Cary Edwards's loss to Jim Courter in the 1989 primary, Edwards was seen as the natural favorite for the 1993 nomination. He was a key member of the popular Thomas Kean administration, first as general counsel and then as state Attorney General. However, his path to the nomination became complicated by Christine Todd Whitman's 1990 campaign for United States Senate. Her underdog two-point loss endeared her to the party base and made her the leading public advocate of the anti-tax cause.

Whitman continued to build her profile by founding a political action committee, the Committee for an Affordable New Jersey, through which she campaigned for Republican candidates in the 1991 midterm elections. Whitman took on a full campaign speaking schedule through October 1992 and worked to distance herself from veteran consultant Roger Stone after Stone facilitated a primary challenge to State Senator William Gormley, a potential 1993 opponent.

Candidates
W. Cary Edwards, candidate for Governor in 1989 and former New Jersey Attorney General and State Assemblyman from Oakland
J. Patrick Gilligan, American Stock Exchange consultant and former Morris Township board of education member
James Wallwork, former State Senator from Short Hills and candidate for Governor in 1981
Christine Todd Whitman, former Somerset County Freeholder and Board of Public Utilities president, and nominee for the United States Senate in 1990

Withdrew
Charles P. Hoffman, business consultant (withdrew May 6, endorsed Wallwork)

Declined 
 William Gormley, State Senator from Mays Landing and candidate for Governor in 1989
 Thomas Kean, former Governor of New Jersey

Campaign
The primary campaign was marked by negative exchanges between the three strongest candidates and Whitman's clear status as the front-runner throughout.

Illegal alien hiring controversy
The campaign began as a two-candidate race between Christine Whitman and Cary Edwards. Polling suggested that either would beat Governor Florio but that Whitman was generally the stronger of the two. In February, responding to national controversy over nominee for U.S. Attorney General Zoë Baird's hiring of illegal aliens in violation of federal law, both candidates voluntarily disclosed that they had done so too and failed to required taxes or fines. The revelation dramatically weakened both campaigns; seventy percent of voters said the admission was very or somewhat serious. 

Soon after, former State Senator James Wallwork declared his candidacy as a conservative alternative to Whitman and Edwards, tapping into populist unrest. Like H. Ross Perot and Jerry Brown had during the 1992 presidential campaign, Wallwork offered voters a toll-free number they could call to directly propose positions. Wallwork, who had last cut a political figure in a 1981 campaign for governor, said his campaign would be about "people taking back their government."

In the final weeks of the campaign, Whitman ran advertisements presenting herself as a candidate for change but not mentioning her opponents or Governor Florio by name. Edwards attacked both Whitman in Florio in his advertisements, while Wallwork focused on painting Whitman as "liberal" and ran an ad stating that she had voted to raise taxes 17 times as Somerset Freeholder. In the final week of the campaign, Whitman began running negative advertisements as well.

A large portion of the campaign was focused on winning over the 522,000 New Jerseyans who had voted for H. Ross Perot in the 1992 presidential campaign. Perot remained popular in the state; on the final weekend of the campaign, he hosted a get-out-the-vote rally which all three candidates attended.

Debates
The three major candidates participated in at least six debates and two mandatory televised debates.

By May 11, Whitman was the heavy favorite entering the first televised debate in Whippany; her campaign claimed no less than a double-digit lead over both opponents. At the debate, all three candidates agreed in their opposition to the Florio tax increase but disagreed over how to repeal it. Edwards called for a new popularly elected office of Auditor to evaluate potential budget cuts, while Wallwork and Whitman argued that the powerful line-item veto allowed the Governor to do so immediately. Whitman also attacked Edwards for a nine percent increase in crime during his tenure as Attorney General, a preemptive rebuttal to Edwards's accusation that she was soft on crime.

The second televised debate on May 26 was focused on business issues and was less contentious; the candidates mostly agreed on automobile insurance reform, managed health care, unemployment, pollution legislation and sports betting. At one point, during an exchange on unemployment, Edwards accused Whitman of not understanding the plight of the unemployed, saying "At least I have had a job in my life." Whitman demanded an apology for this and an earlier comment in which Edwards, during a two-person debate with Wallwork, said he "resented" running against a woman. Edwards declined to apologize and later accused Whitman of "setting him up." Another disagreement came over private school vouchers; Whitman supported them while Edwards was opposed and Wallwork deferred to a public referendum.

Two non-televised debates were hosted by Perot supporters under the banner of "United We Stand." All three candidates attended the first but only Edwards and Wallwork attended the second.

Endorsements

Polling

Results

Results by county
The following partial results by county were reported in the Morristown Daily Record for June 10, 1993. The overall totals differ only slightly from the certified primary results, by about one hundred votes per candidate throughout the state.

General election

Candidates
Alene S. Ammond, public-relations executive and former State Senator (Hands-On Government) 
Marilyn Arons, public advocate for disabled children (Maximum Citizen Involvement)
Tom Blomquist, head of the New Jersey Conservative Party (Conservative)
Pat Daly, (Abortion is Murder)
Pete DiLauro, retired New York City Police Department officer (Common Sense Government)
Tim Feeney, dentist (Independent Choice)
James Florio, incumbent Governor of New Jersey (Democratic)
Tom Fuscaldo, former factory maintenance worker (Zero Sales Tax)
Jerry T. Grant, car salesman (You and I)
Kenneth R. Kaplan, industrial/commercial real estate broker (Libertarian)
John L. Kucek, certified public accountant (Populist)
Andrea Lippi, poet (People Purpose Progress)
Richary J. Lynch, Camden businessman (Independents 4 Change)
Joseph Marion, trade association manager (Independent)
Mark J. Rahn, warehouse worker (Socialist Workers)
Michael R. Scully, attorney (Fresh Start)
Christine Todd Whitman, former Somerset County Freeholder and Board of Public Utilities president (Republican)
Andrew J. Zemel, quality control consultant (Integrity-Common Sense)
Michael "Mike" Ziruolo, trucking consultant (Better Affordable Government)

Campaign
Florio had become unpopular following a 1990 $2.8-billion tax increase though he promised not to raise taxes in his successful 1989 campaign. As a result of the tax increase, Republicans were swept into both houses of the Legislature in 1991. A 1990 bill that was signed into law banning assault weapons was used against Florio in advertisements by the National Rifle Association. A proposal by Whitman to cut income taxes by 30% over three years were met with skepticism from voters.

Polling
Polling for the election mostly showed that Florio would be reelected. Polls conducted within a few weeks of the election by The Star-Ledger, The New York Times, the Record of Hackensack, and Rutgers-Eagleton showed Florio besting Whitman by at least eight points. The final poll released before the election, however was conducted by the Asbury Park Press and showed a 38-38 tie with 22% undecided, and undecided and independent voters tended towards Whitman at the time of the election.

with Edwards

with Wallwork

Results

References

External links
U.S. Election Atlas

1993
Gubernatorial
New Jersey
November 1993 events in the United States